Louis-Simon Auger (29 December 1772, in Paris – 2 January 1829, in Paris) was a French journalist, literary critic and playwright.

External links 
 
 Lettres de Mmes. de Villars, de Coulanges et de La Fayette, de Ninon de L'Enclos et de Mademoiselle Aïssé accompagnées de notices bibliographiques, de notes explicatives par Louis-Simon Auger
 

Members of the Académie Française
18th-century French journalists
19th-century French journalists
French male journalists
18th-century French dramatists and playwrights
19th-century French dramatists and playwrights
Writers from Paris
1772 births
1829 deaths
Suicides by drowning in France
19th-century French male writers
18th-century French male writers